Lepsi (Lepsı), is a village in Sarkand District, Almaty Region, in south-eastern Kazakhstan, located at an altitude of 1,018 meters above sea level. It is 124 km (82 miles) away from the regional center Taldykorgan and 924 km (574 miles) from the capital city of Nur-Sultan. It is located to the south of Lake Balkhash, on the Lepsy River. It is a stop on the train between Almaty and Semey on the Turkestan–Siberia Railway.

The village is the seat of Lepsi Village Administration, which also includes the station villages Akbalik (Акбалик, pop. 90), Arganati (Арганати, pop. 40), Karatas (Каратас, pop. 94), Keregetas (Керегетас, pop. 14), Kokshalgin (Кокшалгин, pop. 25), and Sarikurak (Сарикурак, pop. 19).

References

Populated places in Almaty Region
Semirechye Oblast